Chris Wells is a Welsh curler and curling coach.

At the international level, he is a 2007 European mixed champion curler.

He started curling in 1972.

Teams

Men's

Mixed

Record as a coach of national teams

Personal life
As of 1995, Wells was employed as a physician.

References

External links

Living people
Welsh male curlers
European curling champions
Welsh curling coaches
Year of birth missing (living people)
Place of birth missing (living people)
20th-century Welsh medical doctors